Private Eye, the fortnightly British satirical magazine, has published various books and other material separately from the magazine since 1962.

Published by Private Eye

The principal publications are anthologies, for example the Private Eye Annual, and ongoing series such as the Colemanballs collections (in even-numbered years), and diaries of the Prime Minister.  "The Private Eye Annual" has been published in a variety of forms since the early 1970s and traditionally contains reprints from the middle section of the magazine; satirical articles and cartoons.

The magazine has reprinted several hard-hitting articles and made them available as separate pamphlets. One such article was their report on the 2001 outbreak of foot and mouth disease in the United Kingdom, and the response the government gave to it.

In former years, the magazine published collections of their strip cartoons.  In particular, The Adventures of Barry McKenzie, the exploits of an uncouth Australian expatriate in Sixties London, written by Barry Humphries and illustrated by Nicholas Garland, was published in three collections, long since out of print and now collectors' items.  The Bill Tidy strip The Cloggies was also issued in this form.

Each year the magazine publishes a number of Christmas cards, which typically feature cartoons on Christmas themes from regular contributors.

Patrick Marnham’s ‘’The Private Eye Story’’ (1982) was the first major attempt to tell the history of the magazine. A fiftieth anniversary biography by Adam Macqueen was published in 2011.

Private Eye books

Humorous Cuttings

Anthologies of the unintentionally humorous newspaper cuttings which have formed a regular part of the magazine since its earliest days.

 ‘’Private Eye’s Book of Boobs’’ (1966)
 ‘’What the Papers Never Meant to Say: Private Eye’s Second Book of Boobs’’ (1968)
 
  (Note: (sic) is part of the title of the paperback edition, but not of the hardback)

Colemanballs and Mediaballs

Private Eye Annuals and Anthologies

 ‘’Private Eyewash’’ (1968)
 ‘’Private Eyeballs’’ (1969)
 ‘’Private Eyesores’’ (1970)
 ‘’The Life and Times of Private Eye 1961-71’’ (1971)
 ‘’The Best of Private Eye 1972’’ (1972)
 ‘’The Best of Private Eye 1973: Anatomy of Neasden’’ (1973)
 ‘’The Best of Private Eye 1974: A Load of Rubbish’’ (1974)
 ‘’The Best of Private Eye 1976: Lord Gnome of the Rings’’ (1976)
 ‘’The Best of Private Eye 1978: Wholly Libel’’ (1978)
 ‘’The Best of Private Eye 1980: The Country Diary of an Edwardian Gnome’’ (1980)
 ‘’The Best of Private Eye 1982: Bargshead Revisited’’ (1982)
 ‘’The Best of Private Eye 1982 – 5’’ (1985)
 ‘’The Best of Private Eye 1985 – 7: The Gnome of the Rose’’ (1987)
 ‘’The Best of Private Eye 1987 – 9: Satiric Verses’’ (1989)
 
 ‘’The Best of Private Eye 1991 – 3: A Gnome in Provence’’ (1993)
 ‘’The Best of Private Eye 1994: Absolutely Libellous’’ (1994)
 ‘’The Best of Private Eye 1995: Magic Private Eye’’ (1995)
 
 
 
 
 
 
 
 
 
 
 
 ‘’The Private Eye Annual 2007’’
 ‘’The Private Eye Annual 2008’’
 ‘’The Private Eye Annual 2009’’

Strip cartoon collections

 
 
 ‘’Cloggies Dance Again’’ (1973)
 ‘’Private Eye Cartoon Library 1: Heath’’ (1973)
 ‘’Private Eye Cartoon Library 2: Hector Breeze’’ (1973)
 ‘’Private Eye Cartoon Library 3: 100 Best Jokes of Larry’’ (1974)
 ‘’Private Eye Cartoon Library 4: Martin Honeysett’’ (1974)
 ‘’Private Eye Cartoon Library 5: Barry Fantoni’’ (1975)
 ‘’Private Eye Cartoon Library 8: Michael Ffolkes’’ (1976)
 ‘’Private Eye Cartoon Library: Kevin Woodcock’’ (1978)
 
 ‘’Private Eye Cartoonists: Peter Maddocks’’ (1981)
 ‘’Penguin Book of Private Eye Cartoons’’ (1983)
 ‘’Private Eye Cartoon Library 11: David Austin’’ (1984)
 
   (Hard-to-find collection of all Barry McKenzie strips.)
 ‘’Doubletakes – A Decade of Cartoons from Private Eye: The Sixties’’
 ‘’Drambusters – A Decade of Cartoons from Private Eye: The Eighties’’
 
 ‘’Private Eye Cartoon Diary: 1995’’ (1994)

Satirical "Prime Minister" memoirs

 
 
 
 
 ‘’The Other Half – Further Letters of Denis Thatcher’’ (1981)
 ‘’One For The Road’’ (1982)
 ‘’My Round!’’ (1983)
 ‘’Bottoms Up!’’ (1984)
 ‘’Down the Hatch! Further letters of Denis Thatcher’’ (1985)
 ‘’Just the One: Further Letters of Denis Thatcher’’ (1986)
 ‘’Mud In Your Eye’’ (1987)
 ‘’Still Going Strong’’ (1988)
 ‘’Number 10’’ (1989)
 ‘’On And On?’’ (1990)
 ‘’The Best of Dear Bill’’ (1986)

Special Issues

A mixture of revised reprints of material featured in the magazine, retrospectives and entirely new material.

 Not the Scott Report (1994)
 Neasden FA Cup Special (1995)
 A Tribute to Willie Rushton (1997)
 Lockerbie: The Flight from Justice (2001)
 MMR Special: A comprehensive review of the MMR vaccination/autism controversy
 Foot-and-Mouth Crisis: Everything Tony Blair didn't want you to know...

Specials were later abandoned in favour of occasional ‘pull out sections’ in the main magazine.

Miscellaneous Titles

 ‘’Private Eye on London’’ (1962)
 ‘’Private Eye’s Romantic England and Other Unlikely Stories’’ (1963)
 ‘’The Six & You: A Private Eye Guide’’ (1971)
 ‘’Private Eye Book of Pseuds’’ (1973)
 ‘’True Stories from Private Eye’’ (1973)
 ‘’Love in the Saddle’’ (1973)
 ‘’A Little Pot of Money: The Story of Reginald Maudling and the Real Estate Fund of America’’ by Michael Gillard (1974)
 ‘’The Diaries of Auberon Waugh: A Turbulent Decade, 1976 – 85’’ (1985)
 ‘’Four Crowded Years: The Diaries of Auberon Waugh, 1972 – 76’’ (1976)
 ‘’Book of Covers – 60 of the Best’’ (1978)
 ‘’So Farewell Then and Other Poems by EJ Thribb (17)’’ (1978)
 ‘’Goldenballs!’’ (1979)
 
 ‘’Born to Be Queen’’ (1981)
 ‘’Private Eye’s Oxford Book of Pseuds’’ (1983)
 ‘’Private Eye Crosswords’’ by Tom Driberg (1983)
 ‘’The Secret Diary of a Lord Gnome Aged 73 ¾’’ (1983)
 ‘’Bumper Book of Covers: 1962 – 84’’ (1984)
 ‘’The Secret Diary of a Lord Gnome Aged 73’’ (1985)
 ‘’Cover-Up!’’ (1989)
 ‘’Private Eye Cover Up! A Selection of the Best Private Eye Covers from the Last Five Years’’ (1990)
 ‘’Lord Gnome’s Complete Fib & Lie Diet’ (1991)
 ‘’Poetry Corner: Collected Verses from Thirty Years of Private Eye’’ (1992)
 ‘’Thomas the Privatised Tank Engine by Incledon Clark’’ (1994)
 ‘’Lord Gnome’s Literary Companion’’ (1994)
 ‘’The Private Eye Book of Craig Brown Parodies’’ (1995)
 ‘’Son of Yobs’’ (1995)
 ‘’Cover Up!’’ (1995)
 ‘’The Book of Covers: Celebrating 1000 Issues’’ (1997)
 
 ‘’Funny Old World’’ (1997)
 ‘’The Diaries of Auberon Waugh’’ (omnibus; 1998)
 ‘’The Craig Brown Omnibus’’ (1999)
 
 ‘’Better Late Than Never’’ (2001)
 
 
 
   (Richard Ingrams' tribute to the late Paul Foot.)
 
 ‘’Dumb Britain’’ (2007)
 ‘’Dumb Britain’’ (2009)

Book
British books